Araquem José de Melo (7 July 1944 – 2001), commonly known as Araquem de Melo, was a Brazilian footballer who played for clubs in Uruguay, Argentina and Greece.

Career
Born in Rio de Janeiro, Araquem de Melo began playing football for the youth sides of local side Club de Regatas Vasco da Gama. He played for Danubio F.C. and was the Uruguayan league's top goal-scorer during the 1966 season. He played for Argentine side Club Atlético Huracán from 1968 to 1972.

In 1972, he joined Panathinaikos F.C. as the first Brazilian footballer who ever played for the club. He remains the leading goal-scorer among Brazilians for Panathinaikos. Araquem de Melo scored 19 goals in 37 games with Panathinaikos, along with Juan Ramón Verón and Antonis Antoniadis making a great attacking line. In 1974, he played for Atromitos. In 1976, he played in the National Soccer League with Toronto Panhellenic where he assisted in securing the NSL Championship against Toronto First Portuguese.

Retirement
After he retired from playing football, Araquem de Melo founded a football school in Brazil. His brother, Arnout de Melo, assumed responsibility for the club after Araquem's death in 2001.

In 2001, he committed suicide, due to debt problems.

References

External links
Araquem de Melo at Enciclopedia de Huracan

Araken Demelo at Phantis.com

1944 births
2001 deaths
Brazilian footballers
Brazilian expatriate footballers
Danubio F.C. players
Club Atlético Huracán footballers
Atromitos F.C. players
Panathinaikos F.C. players
Uruguayan Primera División players
Argentine Primera División players
Super League Greece players
Expatriate footballers in Argentina
Expatriate footballers in Uruguay
Expatriate footballers in Greece
Expatriate soccer players in Canada
Brazilian expatriate sportspeople in Canada
Brazilian expatriate sportspeople in Argentina
Brazilian expatriate sportspeople in Uruguay
Brazilian expatriate sportspeople in Greece
Association football forwards
Association football midfielders
Canadian National Soccer League players
Footballers from Rio de Janeiro (city)